Mind Reflections is the fifth studio album from Dutch death metal band Pestilence. Mind Reflections is a best-of compilation with both studio and live songs.

Track listing

Pestilence (band) albums
1994 greatest hits albums
Albums with cover art by Dan Seagrave
Roadrunner Records compilation albums